Tirsuli West, or Trishuli West, is a Himalayan mountain peak in the Chamoli district of Uttarakhand, India. It is part of the complex of mountains, including Tirsuli, Hardeol, Dunagiri, Changabang, and Kalanka, which make up the northeast wall of the Nanda Devi Sanctuary, in the Garhwal Himalaya. It lies very near both Tirsuli and Hardeol at the north end of the Johar Valley.

Tirsuli West was climbed for the first time in 2001, via the Southwest Ridge, by a team from the Nehru Institute of Mountaineering. They placed four camps on the route. This was the last peak over 7,000 m (22,966 ft) in the Garhwal and Kumaon districts to be climbed.

See also
 Tirsuli

References

Geography of Chamoli district
Mountains of Uttarakhand